Levin railway station is a station on the North Island Main Trunk serving Levin in the Horowhenua District of New Zealand. It is served by the Capital Connection long-distance commuter train between Wellington and Palmerston North. Prior to the service's cessation in 2012, it was also served by the Overlander long-distance train between Wellington and Auckland.

History
The station was opened by the Wellington and Manawatu Railway Company (WMR) in 1886 as an intermediate station on the Wellington-Manawatu Line. The first station was built in the northern part of Levin near Tyne Street, and was replaced in 1894–95 by a station near the centre of Levin. In 1909 this station was destroyed by fire, and replaced by a station 10 chains (200m) south. There was a nearby station in the southern part of Levin at Weraroa from c1886 to 1894.

Two former railway (staff) houses in Levin have Class II listing with Heritage New Zealand, 29 Keepa Street and 31 Keepa Street.

Further reading 

 
Hoy, Douglas, West of the Tararuas: An Illustrated History of the Wellington and Manawatu Railway Company pp. 59, 60, 120 (Wellington, Southern Press, 1972)

External links 
Levin in the Cyclopaedia of New Zealand (1908)

Railway stations in New Zealand
Buildings and structures in Manawatū-Whanganui
Railway stations opened in 1886
Rail transport in Manawatū-Whanganui
Levin, New Zealand